Piqueti Djassi Brito Silva (born 12 February 1993), knowly simply as Piqueti, is a Bissau-Guinean professional footballer who plays for Saudi club Al-Shoulla FC and the Guinea-Bissau national team as a right winger.

Club career
Born in Bissau, Piqueti signed for S.C. Braga in 2011 for his last year as a junior. He went on to spend several seasons with the reserves in the Segunda Liga, making his debut in the competition on 22 August 2012 by coming on as a second-half substitute in a 1–0 away loss against C.F. Belenenses.

Piqueti first appeared in the Primeira Liga with the first team on 14 March 2014, playing two minutes of the 1–1 away draw with Académica de Coimbra. Again from the bench, on 5 April, he scored his first goal competitive goal for them, contributing to a 2–0 victory at S.C. Olhanense.

Late into the 2015 winter transfer window, Piqueti was loaned to fellow league club Gil Vicente FC, featuring rarely in a relegation-ending campaign. On 30 May 2017, he signed with C.S. Marítimo also of the top division, who in turn loaned him to second-tier Académica.

On 26 February 2019, Piqueti joined Prince Mohammad bin Salman League's Al-Shoulla FC from Italian amateurs S.S.D. Varese Calcio.

International career
Piqueti represented Portugal at under-20 level, notably helping his adopted nation to the fourth place in the 2013 Toulon Tournament. He switched allegiance to Guinea Bissau in 2015, earning his first senior cap on 8 October by replacing Cícero Semedo in the 72nd minute of the 1–1 draw in Liberia for the 2018 FIFA World Cup qualifiers (4–2 aggregate defeat).

Piqueti was selected for the 2017 Africa Cup of Nations by manager Baciro Candé, featuring 29 minutes in the group stage opener against hosts against Gabon (1–1). He scored his first goal for his country the following match, putting his team ahead in an eventual 2–1 loss to Cameroon; the individual effort was described as "superb".

Piqueti was also part of the squad at the 2019 and 2021 Africa Cup of Nations.

International goals

Scores and results list Guinea-Bissau's goal tally first, score column indicates score after Piqueti goal.

References

External links

1993 births
Living people
Bissau-Guinean emigrants to Portugal
Portuguese sportspeople of Bissau-Guinean descent
Sportspeople from Bissau
Bissau-Guinean footballers
Portuguese footballers
Association football wingers
Primeira Liga players
Liga Portugal 2 players
S.C. Braga B players
S.C. Braga players
Gil Vicente F.C. players
C.S. Marítimo players
Associação Académica de Coimbra – O.A.F. players
S.S.D. Varese Calcio players
Saudi First Division League players
Al-Shoulla FC players
Egyptian Premier League players
Ismaily SC players
Portugal youth international footballers
Guinea-Bissau international footballers
2017 Africa Cup of Nations players
2019 Africa Cup of Nations players
2021 Africa Cup of Nations players
Bissau-Guinean expatriate footballers
Expatriate footballers in Portugal
Expatriate footballers in Italy
Expatriate footballers in Saudi Arabia
Expatriate footballers in Egypt
Bissau-Guinean expatriate sportspeople in Portugal
Bissau-Guinean expatriate sportspeople in Italy
Bissau-Guinean expatriate sportspeople in Saudi Arabia
Bissau-Guinean expatriate sportspeople in Egypt